Forte de Santa Maria is a fort located in Salvador, Bahia in Brazil. It is also known as the Fortim de Santa Maria.  It retains much of its original structure of the 17th century, including its broad, stone curtain walls. The fort is in the shape of a heptagon and is accessed via a narrow embankment. The fort was listed as a historic structure by the National Institute of Historic and Artistic Heritage (IPHAN) in 1938. It is closed to the public, is not maintained by federal or state institutions and is falling into a state of disrepair.

Ownership and abandonment

Under Article 20 of the Constitution of Brazil of 1988 the Forte de Santa Maria is classified as a military installation and owned by the Armed Forces of Brazil. It, as well as ten other forts in Salvador, are assets of the Secretariat of Patrimony of the Union (SPU) ( in Bahia. The Brazilian Navy transferred the fort to the SPU in 2001. The SPU stated in 2020 that it is unable to maintain the fort; it has remained closed to the public since 2001. Lacking any maintenance, the walls of the fort are both damaged and unpainted. An NGO was established to manage the fort, but the venture proved unsuccessful. The SPU hopes to return the fort to the Brazilian Navy.

Protected status

The São Paulo da Gamboa Battery was listed as a historic structure by the National Institute of Historic and Artistic Heritage (IPHAN) in 1938.

Condition and access

The Forte de Santa Maria is not open to the public and may not be visited.

See also
Military history of Brazil

References

External links

Santa Maria
Buildings and structures in Salvador, Bahia
Portuguese colonial architecture in Brazil
National heritage sites of Bahia